Maze Runner: The Scorch Trials (stylized onscreen simply as The Scorch Trials) is a 2015 American dystopian science fiction film based on James Dashner's 2010 novel The Scorch Trials, the second novel in The Maze Runner book series. The film is a direct sequel to the 2014 film The Maze Runner and the second installment in The Maze Runner film series. It was directed by Wes Ball, with a screenplay by T.S. Nowlin. Adding to the original film's cast of Dylan O'Brien, Kaya Scodelario, Thomas Brodie-Sangster, Dexter Darden, Alexander Flores, Ki Hong Lee, and Patricia Clarkson, the new supporting cast includes Nathalie Emmanuel, Giancarlo Esposito, Aidan Gillen, Jacob Lofland, Katherine McNamara, Barry Pepper, Rosa Salazar, Lili Taylor, and Alan Tudyk.

The plot of The Scorch Trials takes place immediately after the previous installment, as Thomas (O'Brien) and his fellow Gladers have just escaped from the facilities of the powerful World Catastrophe Killzone Department (WCKD), which had imprisoned them. On the run in the desert and ruined cities, they must escape WCKD soldiers and face the perils of the Scorch, a desolate landscape filled with dangerous obstacles. Filming began in Albuquerque, New Mexico on October 27, 2014, and officially concluded on January 27, 2015.

Maze Runner: The Scorch Trials was released in select international territories starting September 9, 2015, in 2D, 3D, 4DX and Barco Escape, and was released on September 18, 2015, in the United States in 2D and premium large-format theaters by 20th Century Fox. It was originally set to be released in IMAX, but this was canceled, except Japan (converted to 3D), as Everest had all worldwide IMAX screens booked until the release of the film The Walk. The Scorch Trials received mixed reviews: some commended its action sequences and performances; others criticized the film for its lack of plot and character advancement. Like its predecessor, the film was a commercial success grossing $30.3  million on its opening weekend, making it the ninth-highest grossing debut in September. The film went to the number one spot at the box office during its opening weekend, and grossed $312 million worldwide.

The concluding entry, titled Maze Runner: The Death Cure, was released on January 26, 2018.

Plot
A mother drops off her scared reluctant son, Thomas, with the scientist Ava Paige and troops of the organization WCKD. Thomas and other abandoned children are placed in a walled maze in a place known as the Glade as part of its scientific testing.

Years later, shortly after being rescued from the Maze, Thomas and the remaining Gladers (Teresa, Newt, Minho, Frypan and Winston) are taken to a facility run by Mr. Janson. He says that the facility is a haven protecting them from the Flare virus and the "Cranks", and provides the supplies. Under Mr. Janson's care, they discover that they were not the only Gladers and that many more mazes were constructed, aside from their own. Thomas becomes suspicious of Mr. Janson and investigates. With help from Aris, the first maze survivor to arrive in the facility (from another maze), Thomas discovers that WCKD's leader, Ava, is still alive and that Mr. Janson is working for WCKD when they discuss experiments on the Immunes and that Janson has yet to find the Right Arm, a resistance group in the mountains. The group, including Aris, escapes the facility to the deserted outside world, the Scorch. Mr. Janson orders WCKD troops to track them down.

The group arrives at an abandoned shopping mall and encounters the Cranks, humans zombified by the Flare virus. Winston gets infected by one of them. When morning comes, they find the city in ruins and the WCKD still searching for them. Winston's infection becomes worse, which forces the others to let him kill himself to prevent his transformation. While crossing the desert, the group takes shelter in the abandoned facility as a deadly lightning storm hits, nearly killing them all. Inside, they discover that it is filled with chained Cranks. The group meets Brenda and Jorge, who leads a dangerous band of survivors and have used the Cranks as guard dogs. Brenda and Jorge agree to take them to the Right Arm and abandon their group of survivors. Minutes later, WCKD, led by Janson, storms the place, only for the facility to be destroyed by Jorge's explosives. Thomas and Brenda are left behind, as the rest escape with Jorge. As Thomas and Brenda escape the Cranks, Brenda is infected. Thomas experiences a flashback of him and Teresa working for WCKD in which Thomas tries to warn Teresa of WCKD's plans, only for both to be separated by WCKD's troops. As Thomas and Brenda reunite with the rest of the group, Jorge interrogates Marcus, a survivor who secretly works for WCKD, into revealing the location of the Right Arm.

The group eventually arrives at a road block, where several people shoot at them. As Jorge is about to activate a device, a woman asks him to drop the device, aims her rifle at him, freezes when she recognizes Aris, and reveals herself to be Harriet. She and Sonya take Brenda, Aris, Jorge and the Gladers to the Right Arm's outpost relief camps, where other immune survivors are present. Vince, who leads the Right Arm, greets them. As Brenda's infection gets worse, Vince threatens to shoot her, only to be stopped by Mary Cooper, a former WCKD scientist who reveals that Thomas was their informant, who has also helped the Right Arm take down WCKD's illegal major operations ever since. As Mary halts Brenda's infection by using an enzyme cure, Mary explains that the enzyme must be harvested from an Immune's body, not manufactured and that arguments over the methods of manufacturing the cure with Ava led to Mary's departure from WCKD. That evening, Teresa tells WCKD of her location since she believes that WCKD's motivations are good, which leads to an ambush by WCKD. Soldiers quickly overwhelm the Right Arm Rebels and line up the survivors in front of Ava Paige and Janson, who arrive in a berg (a very large aerial vehicle employed by WCKD as transportation). Teresa explains to Thomas that she got her memories back from WCKD whilst with Mr. Janson. Mary is shot and killed by Janson, and WCKD troops take the immune survivors for experimentation, including Minho, Sonya and Aris. With only a fraction of survivors left at the site, Thomas plans to infiltrate WCKD.

Cast

 Dylan O'Brien as Thomas
 Kaya Scodelario as Teresa
 Thomas Brodie-Sangster as Newt
 Dexter Darden as Frypan
 Nathalie Emmanuel as Harriet
 Giancarlo Esposito as Jorge
 Alexander Flores as Winston
 Aidan Gillen as Janson
 Ki Hong Lee as Minho
 Jacob Lofland as Aris
 Katherine McNamara as Sonya
 Barry Pepper as Vince
 Rosa Salazar as Brenda
 Lili Taylor as Mary Cooper
 Alan Tudyk as Marcus (credited as "Blondie")
 Patricia Clarkson as Ava Paige

Production

Pre-production
On October 13, 2013, almost a year before The Maze Runner'''s release, it was reported that Fox had started work on The Scorch Trials. It was revealed that T.S. Nowlin – who had recently worked on the  Fantastic Four reboot – would adapt Maze Runner: The Scorch Trials, taking over from Noah Oppenheim, with returning director Wes Ball supervising Nowlin's script.

The early development of Maze Runner: The Scorch Trials suggested to many that Fox was confident in the potential success of The Maze Runner. On November 19, 2014, John Paesano was confirmed to return to score the film. Creature designer Ken Barthelmey returned to design the "Cranks" for the film.

Casting
On September 26, 2014, Aidan Gillen was cast as Janson, also known as Rat-Man. On September 30, 2014, Rosa Salazar signed on to the cast as Brenda. Within the next few days, Mud star Jacob Lofland and Giancarlo Esposito joined the cast, playing Aris Jones and Jorge, respectively. Nathalie Emmanuel was cast as Harriet, co-leader of Group B, on October 22, 2014, and Katherine McNamara as the other co-leader on December 22. On November 3, 2014, there were two additions to the cast, with Lili Taylor as Mary Cooper, a "doctor who helps Thomas and the Gladers", and Barry Pepper as Vince, "a survivalist who is one of the last remaining soldiers of a legendary unit called the Right Arm".

Filming
On July 25, 2014, Ball announced at San Diego Comic-Con International that the studio wanted to start shooting in fall 2014, should its predecessor become a success when it hit theaters.

On August 31, 2014, Ball announced they were "about nine weeks out from shooting". He also revealed "we are in New Mexico right now. We've got a crew and stages. We are rapidly approaching our shoot time. The sets are being built. A lot of the same crew is coming back. Most of the cast is coming back, except for the ones who were killed [in the first film]. The script is coming along". A week later, Ball told BuzzFeed that "we've got stages, we've got crews coming in, Dylan [O'Brien] will be back in a few weeks, we're building sets, and the script is being written. It's a bit of a race this time because we're cautiously optimistic, but we're feeling excited we're about to do something that's way more sophisticated, way more grown-up, and set up a saga here."

Principal photography commenced on October 27, 2014 in and around Albuquerque, New Mexico. Filming finished on January 27, 2015, lasting 94 days.

Soundtrack
Composed by John Paesano, the soundtrack was released on September 11, 2015.

Release
On August 31, 2014, Ball revealed he is hoping "the movie will be out in about a year". On September 21, 2014, it was announced the film would be released on September 18, 2015 in the United States. The film was released in Barco's multi-screen immersive movie format Barco Escape in across 25 countries with approximately 20 minutes of the film converted into the format. It was also released in the Dolby Vision format in Dolby Cinema in North America.

Marketing

At San Diego Comic-Con International 2014, Ball released the first piece of concept art for the film. Six stills were released on March 11, 2015.

The first official trailer was released on April 23, 2015, at 20th Century Fox's CinemaCon. It was not released online at the same time, but the 1 minute and 44-second teaser trailer premiered before Pitch Perfect 2 in May 2015. The trailer was released publicly on May 19, 2015. On July 10, 2015, a 30-minute sneak peek was screened at San Diego Comic Con International, with Ball, Dashner, and O'Brien also at the screening.

Home mediaThe Scorch Trials was released on Blu-ray and DVD on December 15, 2015.

Reception

Box officeMaze Runner: The Scorch Trials grossed $81.7million in North America and $230.6million in other territories for a worldwide total of $312.3million, against a budget of $61million.

North America
In the United States and Canada, the film was released alongside Black Mass and Captive, and was projected to gross $34–36 million in its opening weekend. It made $1.7 million from its late night screenings—55% ahead of the first film's $1.1 million—from 2,900 theaters and an estimated $11 million on its opening day, which is lower than its predecessor's opening day. It finished off the weekend with $30.3 million from 3,796 theaters, which is lower than its predecessor's $32.5 million (−7%) opening in 2014. Nevertheless, the film opened at No. 1 at the box office ahead of its competitor Black Mass. Premium large formats comprised $2.75 million (9%) of the opening gross from 270 PLF screens, while Cinemark XD contributed $825,000 of that figure in 87 screens. The film relied on younger audiences, with 65 percent of the audience under the age of 25 and women making up 53 percent of ticket buyers. Also noteworthy was that Fox did not release the film in IMAX format as it had with the first installment, as all IMAX screens at the time were devoted to Everest, which was receiving a week-long "sneak preview" release in IMAX and large-format screens. But Fox did release the film on 270 PLF screens, which made up 9% of its overall gross. Deadline Hollywood reported that Fox was nevertheless happy with the result. The franchise followed a similar box-office trajectory as The Divergent Series, which dipped slightly from its first installment ($54.6 million) to second ($52.2 million). Still, both the movies proved "the consistency of the young-adult audience," said Paul Dergarabedian, Rentrak's senior analyst. "They're not growing at a huge rate, but we're also not seeing a massive drop-off." In its second weekend, the film's box office revenues fell by 53% to $14 million, slipping to third place behind Hotel Transylvania 2 ($47.5 million) and The Intern ($18.2 million). In comparison, The Maze Runner dropped 46% in its second weekend. The Scorch Trialss 10-day gross stood at $51.69 million in relation to its predecessor's $57.9 million 10-day gross.

Outside North America
Internationally, The Scorch Trials was released in a total of 76 countries. It was released overseas a week before it opened in the U.S., and earned $26.7 million in its opening weekend from 21 markets in 5,586 screens and in all markets, outperforming its predecessor. It debuted at second place at the international box office, behind Mission: Impossible – Rogue Nation. In its second weekend, it expanded to 41 additional markets and earned a total of $43.2 million from 12,699 screens in 66 markets, opening at No. 1 in 34 of the 41 markets as well as topping the international box office charts. In South Korea, it had the biggest opening for Fox of 2015 with $7.2 million from 804 screens. That's 41% higher than its predecessor's opening. France posted the highest opening for the film with $8.5 million followed by South Korea ($7.2 million) Russia and the CIS ($5.2 million), the United Kingdom, Ireland and Malta ($4.9 million), and Mexico ($4.4 million). In terms of total earning, its largest market outside of the U.S. are France ($25 million), South Korea ($19 million) and the United Kingdom ($13.2 million). It opened in China—its last market—on November 4 and grossed an estimated $19.77 million on 4,945 screens in its five opening weekend ($14.6 million over three days) which is 60% above its predecessor's opening. It has grossed a total of $29.5 million in China making it the biggest market for the film, followed by France ($25.3 million) and South Korea ($19 million).

Critical responseMaze Runner: The Scorch Trials received mixed reviews from critics. On review aggregator website Rotten Tomatoes, the film has an approval rating of 46%, based on 147 reviews, with an average rating of 5.41/10. The website's critical consensus states, "Maze Runner: The Scorch Trials is an action-packed sequel at the cost of story, urgency, and mystery that the original offered." Metacritic gives the film a score of 43 out of 100, based on 29 critics, indicating "mixed or average reviews". Audiences surveyed by CinemaScore gave the film a grade of "B+" on an A+ to F scale.

The main criticisms of the film were its narrative, particularly its changes from the source material, and lack of character development. Forbes said the film suffered from "middle movie syndrome", claiming that it did not offer an introduction nor a finale. The Wrap stated that, "it doesn't offer much plot or character development". Stephen Kelly of Total Film said, "Scorch Trials ambitiously opens up its world with mixed results: gripping action, so-so script." Walter Addiego of the San Francisco Chronicle said, "there's lots of eye candy, and the pace is fast, but somehow the movie falls short."

Some critics considered it to be an improvement over its predecessor, highlighting its action sequences and performances. John Williams of The New York Times wrote, "the many chases and ludicrous narrow escapes offer respectable doses of adrenaline", and Brian Truitt of USA Today said, "Maze Runners action, suspense and twists give movie fans of all ages a chance to embrace their inner on-the-run teenager." Rafer Guzman of Newsday said, "the teen dystopian franchise continues to play rough, and now even rougher, with satisfying results." Bilge Ebiri of Vulture said "essentially, The Scorch Trials makes up for the humdrum Apocalypse of its first half by going a little bonkers in its second."

Accolades

Sequel

In March 2015, it was confirmed that Nowlin, who co-wrote the first and wrote the second film, has been set to adapt the third book, The Death Cure''. Ball confirmed that, if he returned to direct, the film would not be split into two films. On July 9, 2015, it was revealed that filming is set to begin in February 2016. On September 16, 2015, it was confirmed that Ball would return to direct the third film.

Filming was scheduled to start in Vancouver, British Columbia, Canada on March 14, 2016. Following lead Dylan O'Brien's severe accident on set, it was later rescheduled to film between March and June 2017 in South Africa for a January 26, 2018 release.

References

External links

 
 
 
 
 
 

2015 films
2015 3D films
2015 action thriller films
2010s mystery films
2015 science fiction action films
2010s teen films
American 3D films
American action thriller films
American science fiction action films
American sequel films
2010s English-language films
Films based on American novels
Films based on science fiction novels
Films set in deserts
Films set in North America
Films shot in New Mexico
IMAX films
The Maze Runner
American post-apocalyptic films
Science fiction adventure films
Teen mystery films
20th Century Fox films
Films directed by Wes Ball
Films produced by Wyck Godfrey
Films scored by John Paesano
Teen science fiction films
2010s American films